Lo spirito di contradizione (The Spirit of Contradiction) is an opera buffa in three acts by Pietro Alessandro Guglielmi.  

Guglielmi contributed a large part of the music to Pasquale Anfossi's 1763 opera Lo sposo di tre e marito di nessuna, which had a Neapolitan libretto by Antonio Palomba. Much of this work was reused by Guglielmi for Lo spirito di contradizione, with the text revised for the Venetian audience by Gaetano Martinelli.

Performance history
It was first performed at the Teatro San Moisè in Venice during carnival 1766.

Roles

Synopsis
Don Cesarino is scheming to marry three women (Lisetta, Cecchina and the Countess Flaminia) for their dowries and then disappear, but other men also interested in the women, thwart his plan.

References
Hunter, Mary (1992), 'Spirito di contradizione, Lo' in The New Grove Dictionary of Opera, ed. Stanley Sadie (London) 

Operas
Italian-language operas
Opera buffa
Operas by Pietro Alessandro Guglielmi
1766 operas